Cletus Dunn (born May 11, 1948) is a former civil servant and Canadian politician, who was a member of the Legislative Assembly of Prince Edward Island from 2000 to 2007.

Born in Morell, Prince Edward Island, the son of Frank Dunn and Eileen O'Brien, Dunn received a BSc from the University of Prince Edward Island. In 1969, he married Linda MacDonald. He represented the electoral district of Alberton-Miminegash and was a member of the Progressive Conservative Party.

Cletus is the father to 5 children; one of which also ran as a MLA for the PC's and lost by a very small margin of votes. He was also part of Canada Games teams from P.E.I. as a missionary chief.

References 

O'Handley, K Canadian Parliamentary Guide, 2000 

Living people
1948 births
People from Prince County, Prince Edward Island
Progressive Conservative Party of Prince Edward Island MLAs
University of Prince Edward Island alumni
21st-century Canadian politicians